The Galway Anti-Monarchy Campaign (Feachtas Frith-mhonarcacht, Gaillimh) is based in Ireland's westerly city of Galway. Ian O Dálaigh acts as spokesperson for the group.

The group was active and came to prominence during the 2015 visit of Charles, Prince of Wales and Camilla, Duchess of Cornwall to the city during their trip to the west of Ireland. It linked that visit to inequality in Irish society. Galway Anti-Monarchy Campaign demonstrated against the monarchy at the inner-city public park Eyre Square on the day of their visit to the city. It later converged on the National University of Ireland, Galway (NUIG), where the couple were taken as part of their visit to the city. One of its banners read: “Millions Spent on Royalty in Age of Austerity”.

The campaign states its opposition to the monarchy is based on actions by the British army in Ireland and across the world. It contrasted the visit of Prince Charles to austerity policies being enforced in Ireland and Britain.

References

Political advocacy groups in the Republic of Ireland
Protests in the Republic of Ireland